The Leon River is a river in the U.S. state of Texas.  It has three primary forks - the North, Middle, and South Leon Rivers, which meet near Eastland and then run for around  until it meets with the Lampasas River and the Salado Creek to form the Little River near Belton.

Tributaries include Pecan Creek and Cowhouse Creek in Hamilton County, Texas.

Reservoirs
Belton Lake
Proctor Lake

Construction of Belton Dam on the Leon River began in 1947 and was completed in 1954.  Belton Lake took less than two years to fill up and nearly overflowed in 1957.  In October 1993, the Miller Springs Nature Center was constructed along the Leon River just downstream of Belton Dam.

Parks and nature centers
Miller Springs Nature Center is located on both banks of the Leon River just downstream of Belton Dam.  It consists of nearly 11 miles of trails winding among canyon, upland, prairie, and riparian habitats.  The hiking and biking trails in the nature center are enjoyed by hikers, bikers, joggers, birders and all kinds of nature enthusiasts.  Good access to the Leon River is also available for canoers and kayakers.  It is currently operated by the nonprofit Miller Springs Alliance, an organization made up entirely of volunteers.  It is accessible from the Belton side of Belton Dam via the Park Road off Highway FM 439 (Lake Road), and from the Temple side via the Nature Center entrance, off Highway FM 2271 at the north end of Belton Dam.

See also
List of rivers of Texas

References

External links 
 
 

Rivers of Texas
Brazos River
Rivers of Bell County, Texas
Rivers of Comanche County, Texas
Rivers of Eastland County, Texas